The 2021 North Dakota State Bison baseball team represented North Dakota State University during the 2021 NCAA Division I baseball season. The Bison play their home games at Newman Outdoor Field adjacent to NDSU's campus. The team was coached by Tod Brown in his 14th season at NDSU. The Bison won the Summit League tournament for the second time since entering Division 1 and first time since the 2014 season. After entering the NCAA Tournament the Bison went 1-2 and were eliminated after being defeated by No. 7 overall Stanford and No. 17 overall UC Irvine. They defeated Nevada for the team's first ever NCAA Division 1 Tournament game win.

Previous season
The Bison began the 2020 season 8-9 before the NCAA's decision to cancel the season on March 12 due to the COVID-19 pandemic. Due to the season's cancellation, all Division I college baseball players were granted an extra year of eligibility.

Personnel

Roster

Coaching staff

Schedule and results

Stanford Regional

References 

North Dakota State Bison baseball
North Dakota State Bison